Acker Peak is a summit in Yosemite National Park in Tuolumne County, California.

The summit was named for William Bertrand Acker (1859–1935), a park official. This geographical feature's toponym was officially adopted in 1932 by the U.S. Board on Geographic Names.

The first ascent of the summit was made July 27, 1945, by Arthur J. Reyman.

Climate
According to the Köppen climate classification system, Acker Peak is located in an alpine climate zone. Most weather fronts originate in the Pacific Ocean, and travel east toward the Sierra Nevada mountains. As fronts approach, they are forced upward by the peaks (orographic lift), causing them to drop their moisture in the form of rain or snowfall onto the range.

See also
 
 Geology of the Yosemite area

References

External links
 Acker Peak (photo): National Park Service
 Weather forecast: Acker Peak
 William Bertrand Acker: Findagrave.com

Mountains of Yosemite National Park
Mountains of Tuolumne County, California
Mountains of Northern California
North American 3000 m summits
Sierra Nevada (United States)